Mike Henry is a Canadian-born businessman, and the CEO of BHP since 1 January 2020.

Career
Henry graduated with a Bachelors of Science degree in Chemistry from the University of British Columbia. In 1999, Henry came to Australia as an employee of Mitsubishi to help with the joint venture, the BHP Mitsubishi Alliance (BMA), formed by the Japanese company and BHP. In 2001, Henry was seconded to BMA. By 2003, Henry had permanently joined BHP. In 2016, Henry took responsibility of BHP's Minerals Australia operation, of which its Iron Ore assets are a part of.

On 14 November 2019, it was announced that Henry will take over as CEO of BHP from the incumbent, Andrew Mackenzie.

Personal life
Henry has Japanese heritage from his mother. Henry and his wife have two adult daughters, who both live in Canada.

References

Canadian businesspeople
Living people
University of British Columbia alumni
BHP people
1966 births